Harold Leslie Harpur Brown (19 September 1878 – 11 March 1940) was an Australian rules footballer who played with Essendon and St Kilda in the Victorian Football League (VFL).

Notes

External links 

1878 births
1940 deaths
Australian rules footballers from Melbourne
Essendon Football Club players
St Kilda Football Club players
People from Hawthorn, Victoria